Ger FitzGerald (born 24 April 1964) is an Irish retired hurler who played as a right corner-forward for the Cork senior team.

Born in Midleton, County Cork, Fitzgerald first arrived on the inter-county scene at the age of twenty when he first linked up with the Cork under-21 team. He made his senior debut during the 1983–84 league. Fitzgerald later became a regular member of the starting fifteen and won two All-Ireland medals and three Munster medals. He won a national league medal in 1993. He was an All-Ireland runner-up on one occasion.

As a member of the Munster inter-provincial team on a number of occasions, FitzGerald  won a Railway Cup medal in 1992. At club level he is a one-time All-Ireland medallist with Midleton. In addition to this he has also won two Munster medals and four championship medals. Throughout his career FitzGerald made 16 championship appearances. His retirement came following the conclusion of the 1993 championship.

In retirement from playing FitzGerald became involved in team management and coaching. As well as involvement with several club teams he has also served as either manager of selector with the Cork minor, under-21 and senior teams.

Playing career

Club

FitzGerald first came to prominence as a goalkeeper with Midleton at juvenile and underage levels.

After claiming a championship medal in the under-21 grade, FitzGerald was also a key member of the senior team that bridged a forty-five year gap to qualify for the championship decider. The opponents, St. Finbarr's, were appearing in their fifth successive decider and were hoping to secure a fourth championship in-a-row. A 1–18 to 2–9 victory gave Midleton their first title since 1916, while FitzGerald collected his first championship medal. He later collected a Munster medal following a 1–14 to 1–11 defeat of Borris-Ileigh in the provincial decider.

Two-in-a-row proved beyond Midleton, while the club also lost the decider to Blackrock in 1985. The following year Midleton were back in the decider with FitzGerald collecting a second championship medal following a 1–18 to 1–10 defeat of Blackrock.

In 1987 Midleton faced Na Piarsaigh in the championship decider. An exciting 2–12 to 0–15 victory gave FitzGerald a third championship medal. He later won a second Munster medal as Cappawhite were accounted for by 1–12 to 1–11 in the provincial decider. On 17 March 1988 Midleton faced Athenry in the All-Ireland decider and a close game developed. Two early goals by Kevin Hennessy and a kicked goal by Colm O'Neill gave Midleton a 3–8 to 0–9 victory and gave FitzGerald an All-Ireland Senior Club Hurling Championship medal.

FitzGerald was captain of the team in 1991 when Midleton reached the championship decider once again. A 1–17 to 1–8 defeat of Glen Rovers gave him his fourth championship medal.

Inter-county

FitzGerald first played for Cork as a member of the under-21 team on 9 May 1984. He scored a point from full-forward on his debut in a 3–16 to 3–11 Munster semi-final defeat by Tipperary.

After making some appearances for the senior team during the latter stages of the league in 1984, FitzGerald failed to make the championship panel.

FitzGerald was back on the Cork senior team in November 1985. He won an Oireachtas medal that year as Cork defeated Galway by 2–11 to 1–10. He was a regular throughout the subsequent league campaign and was included in Cork's championship team in 1986. Cork made it five-in-a-row in Munster that year as they defeated Clare by 2–18 to 3–12 to take the provincial title, Fitzgerald collected his first winners medal having played in semi final victory over Waterford scoring 2 goals and a pint in that game. Fitzgerald contributed 2goals and 2 pints when cork beat Antrim in the All Ireland semi-final in Croke park. This victory paved the way for an All-Ireland final meeting with Galway on 7 September 1986. The men from the west were the red-hot favourites against a Cork team in decline, however, on the day a different story unfolded. Four Cork goals, one from John Fenton, two from Tomás Mulcahy and one from Kevin Hennessy, stymied the Galway attack and helped the Rebels to a 4–13 to 2–15 victory. It was FitzGerald's first All-Ireland medal .

In 1990 Cork bounced back after a period in decline. He won second Munster medal that year following a 4–16 to 2–14 defeat of Tipperary. The subsequent All-Ireland final on 2 September 1990 pitted Cork against Galway for the second time in four years. Galway were once again the red-hot favourites and justified this tag by going seven points ahead in the opening thirty-five minutes thanks to a masterful display by Joe Cooney. Cork fought back with an equally expert display by captain Tomás Mulcahy. The game was effectively decided on an incident which occurred midway through the second half when Cork goalkeeper Ger Cunningham blocked a point-blank shot from Martin Naughton with his nose. The umpires gave no 65-metre free, even though he clearly deflected it out wide. Cork went on to win a high-scoring and open game of hurling by 5–15 to 2–21. It was a second All-Ireland medal for FitzGerald.

Cork surrendered their All-Ireland crown to Tipperary in 1991, however, FitzGerald was appointed captain of the team in 1992. He later claimed a third Munster medal following a 1–22 to 3–11 of Limerick. On 6 September 1992 Cork faced Kilkenny in the All-Ireland decider. At half-time Cork were two points ahead, however, two second-half goals by John Power and Michael "Titch" Phelan supplemented a first-half D. J. Carey penalty which gave Kilkenny a 3–10 to 1–12 victory.

Retirement
In 2007 FitzGerald returned to the Cork senior hurling scene as a member of Gerald McCarthy’s management team.

Career statistics

Club

Inter-county

References

1964 births
Living people
Midleton hurlers
Cork inter-county hurlers
Munster inter-provincial hurlers
Hurling goalkeepers
Hurling managers
Hurling selectors
All-Ireland Senior Hurling Championship winners